The 1981 Hardy Cup was the 1981 edition of the Canadian intermediate senior ice hockey championship.

Final
Best of 5
Charlottetown 8 Winnipeg 5
Charlottetown 5 Winnipeg 4
Charlottetown 6 Winnipeg 4
Charlottetown Islanders beat Winnipeg North End Flyers 3-0 on series.

External links
Hockey Canada

Hardy Cup
Hardy
Hardy Cup 1981